Tania Mihailuk is an Australian politician who served as a member of the New South Wales Legislative Assembly, representing Bankstown from 2011 to 2023, as a member of the Labor Party, and later as a member of One Nation from October 2022 to March 2023. She is running for the Legislative Council on the One Nation ticket in 2023.

Mihailuk became the first woman to represent Bankstown in its 80-plus-year history. She previously served as mayor of the City of Bankstown, a position she held from 2006 to 2012.

Background and education
Mihailuk attended Macquarie University and graduated with a degree in economics and later a degree in law. She has worked in various industries, including marketing and public policy.

Political career
Mihailuk was elected to Bankstown Council in 2004 and became mayor in 2006.  She was endorsed as the Labor candidate for Bankstown in November 2010 after sitting member Tony Stewart announced his resignation. She stated she would resign from council if she won, which she did, having suffered a swing against her of more than 15 points, as part of the Coalition's landslide election win.

On 20 September 2022, Mihailuk used parliamentary privilege to link Canterbury-Bankstown Council mayor, Khal Asfour, to corrupt former Labor Minister Eddie Obeid. On 23 September, Labor Opposition Leader, Chris Minns, demoted Mihailuk from the Shadow Cabinet. On 20 October 2022, Mihailuk resigned from the NSW Labor Party, claiming that the party was "plagued by corruption" and that it was "too woke".

On 17 January 2023, Mihailuk announced that she would be running second on the One Nation ticket at the upcoming 2023 New South Wales state election for the Legislative Council, behind party leader Mark Latham. Before that, in 2017 when she was a Labor MP she criticised One Nation and Mark Latham. Mihailuk officially resigned from the New South Wales Legislative Assembly on 1st of March 2023.

Personal life
Mihailuk resides in Bankstown with her husband, Alex, and has three children.

Notes

References

Living people
Members of the New South Wales Legislative Assembly
Independent members of the Parliament of New South Wales
Macquarie Law School alumni
New South Wales local councillors
Mayors of Bankstown
Politicians from Sydney
Australian people of Russian descent
21st-century Australian politicians
Russian Orthodox Christians from Australia
Women members of the New South Wales Legislative Assembly
Women mayors of places in New South Wales
Year of birth missing (living people)
Women local councillors in Australia
Australian Labor Party members of the Parliament of New South Wales
21st-century Australian women politicians
Pauline Hanson's One Nation politicians